Ueli Maurer (born 26 May 1960) is a professor of cryptography at the Swiss Federal Institute of Technology Zurich (ETH Zurich).

Education 
Maurer studied electrical engineering at ETH Zurich and obtained his PhD in 1990, advised by James Massey. He joined Princeton University as a postdoc from 1990 to 1991.

Career 
In a seminal work, he showed that the Diffie-Hellman problem is (under certain conditions) equivalent to solving the discrete log problem.

From 2002 until 2008, Maurer also served on the board of Tamedia AG. 

Maurer was appointed editor-in-chief of the Journal of Cryptology in 2002 for a three-year term. He was reappointed to a second three-year term as editor-in-chief of the same journal from 2005.

In 2008, Maurer was named a Fellow of the International Association for Cryptologic Research "for fundamental contributions to information-theoretic cryptography, service to the IACR, and sustained educational leadership in cryptology." In 2015, he was named a Fellow of the Association for Computing Machinery "for contributions to cryptography and information security." In 2016, he was awarded the RSA Award for Excellence in Mathematics.

Accolades 
 2016: RSA Security (RSA) Award for Excellence in Mathematics
 2015: Fellow of the Association for Computing Machinery (ACM)
 2008: Fellow of the International Association for Cryptologic Research (IACR)
 2007: Member of the German National Academy of Sciences Leopoldina
 2003: Fellow of the IEEE

References

External links 
 
 Website of Ueli Maurer at ETH Zurich

1960 births
Living people
Swiss cryptographers
International Association for Cryptologic Research fellows
Fellows of the Association for Computing Machinery
Academic staff of ETH Zurich